Kick Axe is a Canadian heavy metal band from Regina, Saskatchewan. Influenced by rambunctious arena rock from the 70s and early 80s, the group is perhaps best known for their 1984 album Vices, praised by publications such as AllMusic for its "down-and-dirty guitar riffs" and notably managing to crack the American market. The band achieved moderate commercial success in the mid-1980s on the strength of the singles "Heavy Metal Shuffle", "On the Road to Rock", "With a Little Help from My Friends" and "Rock the World". Following the release of their 1986 album Rock the World, Kick Axe disbanded and remained on hiatus for many years. In 2004, they re-emerged with the album Kick Axe IV.

The band's "classic" mid-1980s lineup consisted of George Criston (vocals), Larry Gillstrom (lead guitar), Raymond Harvey (lead guitar), Brian Gillstrom (drums), and Victor Langen (bass guitar). Vocalist Criston did not return for the band's 2004 reunion, being replaced by Gary Langen, who had actually been a founding member of the band in the late 1970s.

History of the band

Early years (1976–1980)
Kick Axe was formed in Regina, Saskatchewan, Canada in 1974 by Larry Gillstrom (guitar), Victor Langen (bass guitar) and his brother Gary Langen (drums, lead vocals), but at those times they called themselves Hobbit. In 1976 they changed the name to Kick Axe. After several line-up changes, by 1979, they added a guitarist Raymond Harvey and  relocated to Vancouver, British Columbia in search of greater exposure. Gary Langen was not willing to leave Saskatchewan and was replaced by Larry's brother Brian Gillstrom. The group began recording in 1979 but scrapped the sessions because they felt they needed a more distinguished front man. Vocalist Charles McNary was brought in and the band started to make waves, even making an appearance on a Playboy compilation album.

Career expansion, decline and fall (1981–1988)
McNary left the band in 1982, and after an international search, he was replaced in 1983 by George Criston (from Milwaukee, Wisconsin, USA), giving Kick Axe the "distinguished front man" they had long desired. Shortly after his joining, the group signed a major label deal with Spencer Proffer's Pasha Records. Their debut album Vices  was released in 1984 to critical acclaim, and the band toured behind such top acts of the day as Judas Priest, Whitesnake, Scorpions, and Pasha label-mates Quiet Riot. The third single from Vices  (appearing only on the chromium dioxide cassette version), a cover of Humble Pie's "30 Days in the Hole" appeared on the Up the Creek movie soundtrack in 1984. The song also appeared on the first of two Muchmusic compilation albums promoting the network's weekly Power Hour program. Vices meant for Kick Axe the biggest commercial success reaching position #126 at the Billboard 200 album chart. 

The band's follow-up album Welcome to the Club  was released in 1985, and included a handful of guest stars. Meanwhile, the group appeared on The Transformers: The Movie soundtrack under the name of Spectre General, the name change being due to legal complications. The band name still appeared as Kick Axe on the Canadian release of the album. They recorded two songs under that name: "Hunger" (later covered by King Kobra in their 1985 album Ready to Strike) and "Nothin's Gonna Stand in Our Way" (originally by John Farnham for the film Savage Streets) which were included on the soundtrack. Guitarist Harvey left the band in 1986, and the band elected to carry on as a four-piece. Their next album Rock the World, a return to their heavy metal roots, was released but by then all momentum had been lost. By 1988, dropped by their record label, Kick Axe broke up.

Reunion without Criston (2003–present)
The band reformed in 2003 with original member Gary Langen singing for Criston who was unavailable to join the reunion due to prior work commitments. The new album entitled Kick Axe IV  was released the following year. In 2008 Gary Langen left the band and was replaced with new vocalist Daniel Nargang, formerly of the Regina metal band Into Eternity. They continue to play Canadian tour dates  and rock festivals.

Current members
Larry Gillstrom - guitars, keyboards, backing vocals (1976-1988, 2003-present)
Victor Langen - bass, keyboards, backing vocals (1976-1988, 2003-present)
Brian Gillstrom - drums, backing vocals (1978-1988, 2003-present)
Raymond Harvey - guitars, backing vocals (1978-1986, 2003-present)
Daniel Nargang - lead vocals (2009-present)

Former members
Gary Langen - drums, lead vocals (1976-1980), lead vocals (2003-2008)
Dave Zurowski - guitars (1976-1978)
Wally Damrick - keyboards (1978)
Charles McNary - lead vocals (1980-1982)
George Criston - lead vocals (1983-1988)

Discography

Studio albums
 Vices (1984) (#66 Canada)
 Welcome to the Club (1985) (#93 Canada)
 Rock the World (1986)
 Kick Axe IV (2004)

Live albums
 Captured Live! (1984) (promotional album)

Singles
 "Weekend Ride" & "One More Time" (1981)
 "On the Road to Rock" & "Stay on Top" (1984)
 "Heavy Metal Shuffle" (1984)
 "With a Little Help from My Friends" & "Can't Take It With You" (1985) (#79 Can.)
 "Comin' After You" & "Feel the Power" (1985)
 "The Chain" & "Red Line" (1986)
 "Nothin's Gonna Stand In Our Way" & "Hunger" (1986) (outside Canada released under the name of Spectre General instead of Kick Axe)

References

External links
Kick Axe Official website
Kick Axe Official Fan website
 
 
 Article at canadianbands.com

1976 establishments in Saskatchewan
Canadian glam metal musical groups
Canadian hard rock musical groups
Canadian heavy metal musical groups
Musical groups established in 1976
Musical groups disestablished in 1988
Musical groups reestablished in 2003
Musical groups from Regina, Saskatchewan